The India national cricket team toured the West Indies during the 1970–71 cricket season. They played five Test matches against the West Indian cricket team, with India winning the series 1–0.

The series can be deemed a landmark in Indian cricket in many ways. This was India's first ever test victory and test series victory over the West Indies. It was also their first victory in West Indies. The series marked the international debut for the batting maestro Sunil Gavaskar and he scored heavily in this series, including four test centuries and a double century. He would go on to serve India for almost 17 more years.

Touring party 
The Indian touring party was announced by the BCCI on 13 January 1971. The selectors named Ajit Wadekar the captain upon dropping Mansoor Ali Khan Pataudi and Chandu Borde, the latter due to lack of form and fitness. S. Venkataraghavan was named the vice-captain. Notable exclusions included spinner B. S. Chandrasekhar, and Farokh Engineer and Rusi Surti, the latter two owing to a ruling that they must have played during the season's Ranji Trophy competition. Keki Tarapore was appointed the tour manager and Subhash Gupte, the liaison officer.

The team members were:
 Ajit Wadekar, Bombay, captain & batsman
 S. Venkataraghavan, Tamil Nadu, vice-captain & off break bowler
 Syed Abid Ali, Hyderabad, medium bowler
 Bishan Singh Bedi, Delhi, left arm spin bowler
 Salim Durani, Rajasthan, left arm spin bowler
 Sunil Gavaskar, Bombay, opening batsman
 Devraj Govindraj, Hyderabad, fast-medium bowler
 ML Jaisimha, Hyderabad, all-rounder
 Kenia Jayantilal, Hyderabad, opening batsman
 Rusi Jeejeebhoy, Bengal, wicket-keeper
 Pochiah Krishnamurthy, Hyderabad, wicket-keeper
 Ashok Mankad, Bombay, batsman
 EAS Prasanna, Mysore, off break bowler
 Dilip Sardesai, Bombay, batsman
 Eknath Solkar, Bombay, left arm medium bowler
 Gundappa Viswanath, Mysore, batsman

Tour matches

Four-day: Jamaica vs Indians

Four-day: West Indies Board President's XI v Indians

Three-day: Leeward Islands v Indians 

The Indians got off to a good start batting first, with Sunil Gavaskar and Ashok Mankad putting together 47 runs for the first wicket. Left-arm spinner Elquemedo Willett bowled out Mankad before lunch, with Ed Arthurton bowling a hostile spell of seam bowling after, to dismiss the Indians' middle-order that included wickets of M. L. Jaisimha and Salim Durani. Gavaskar, playing his first game of the tour, made 82 being dismissed caught and bowled by Willett. His side collapsed to 194/6 before Ajit Wadekar and Syed Abid Ali stitched a 112-run partnership taking their side to 306/6 at end of play on day one. Wadekar, who was dropped twice before he go to 10 went on to make a century.

Four-day: Trinidad and Tobago v Indians

Four-day: Barbados v Indians

Three-day: Windward Islands v Indians

Test matches

1st Test

2nd Test

3rd Test

4th Test

5th Test

References

External links
 Tour home at ESPNcricinfo
 Tour home at ESPNcricinfo archive
 

1971 in Indian cricket
1971 in West Indian cricket
Indian cricket tours of the West Indies
International cricket competitions from 1970–71 to 1975
West Indian cricket seasons from 1970–71 to 1999–2000